Albert T. Davis (born July 28, 1952) is an American businessman and politician who served as a member of the Nebraska Legislature from 2013 to 2017.

Early life and education
Davis was born in Hyannis, Nebraska. As a high school student, Davis wrote and performed in plays. He attended Creighton University and the American Academy of Dramatic Arts before earning a Bachelor of Arts degree in history and economics from the University of Denver.

Career
Prior to entering politics, Davis worked as a real estate developer and ranch-owner. In 2012, incumbent Senator Deb Fischer ran for the U.S. Senate, leaving her seat open. Davis placed second in the May 15, 2012 primary election, then defeated John Ravenscroft in the general election. In his 2016 re-election campaign, Davis was defeated by Tom Brewer. 

Democrat Carol Blood, in her campaign for Governor of Nebraska, chose Al Davis to be her running mate for Lieutenant Governor; both were nominated by the Democratic Party for their respective offices in the May 10, 2022, primary election.

References

External links
Al Davis Website
Official page at the Nebraska Legislature

1952 births
21st-century American politicians
Living people
Nebraska state senators
People from Grant County, Nebraska
University of Denver alumni